The Tweede Klasse is the seventh tier of football in the Netherlands and the fifth tier of Dutch amateur football. The league is divided into 22 divisions, 10 played on Saturday and 12 on Sunday.

Each division consists of 14 teams. The champions are promoted to the Eerste Klasse (First Class), and the teams finishing 13th and 14th are relegated to the Derde Klasse (Third Class). Each season is divided into a number of periods. The winners of these periods qualify for promotion playoffs, provided they finish in the top nine overall in the season. The teams finishing 12th in the final rankings play relegation playoffs.

Divisions

References

7